Maid Sama! is an anime series adapted from the manga of the same title by Hiro Fujiwara. Produced by J.C.Staff and directed by Hiroaki Sakurai, Maid Sama! follows the relationship and romance between Misaki Ayuzawa, the female student council president of Seika High School, an all-boys turned co-ed school though still male-dominated, and Takumi Usui, the mysterious and the most popular boy at Seika High School, who knows that Misaki secretly works part-time at a maid café to support her family.

The anime ran in Japan from April 1 to September 23, 2010 on the Tokyo Broadcasting System and was later simulcast three days later after the Japanese airing in Asia from April 4 to September 26, 2010 on Animax Asia with English subtitles. In North America, The Anime Network started streaming the series via their online player on June 15, and distributed it via Video On Demand on August 5, 2010. The series is licensed in the North America by Sentai Filmworks (now owned by AMC Networks). Animax Asia's English adaptation aired in Southeast Asia from November 25, 2010 to December 30, 2010.

The opening theme, titled "My Secret" is performed by Saaya Mizuno; it was released on May 26, 2010 in normal and special editions, and peak ranked 37th on Oricon singles charts. The first ending theme is  performed by the rock band Heidi.; the single was released on May 26, 2010 in normal and special editions, and peak ranked 32nd in Oricon singles charts. The second ending theme, used from episode 16 onwards is  also performed by Heidi; the single was released on August 25, 2010 in normal and special editions, and peak ranked 48th in Oricon singles charts.

Episode list

References

External links
Maid Sama! at TBS 

Lists of anime episodes